Kundak may refer to:
 Gondek-e Isa, Iran
 Kondek-e Khanjar, Iran